Prof. Michael Ben-Yair (born 1 September 1942) was raised in Sheikh Jarrah until 1948, is a former Attorney General of Israel, a position he held between 1993 and 1996, and former acting judge at the Supreme Court of Israel. 

In 1994, whilst Attorney General, he petitioned the then-Prime Minister Yitzhak Rabin to evict all Jewish settlers living in Hebron, following the attack by Jewish extremist Baruch Goldstein which had resulted in 29 deaths and 125 injuries at the Cave of the Patriarchs/Ibrahimi Mosque. 

In 2014 he called on the European Union to recognise the State of Palestine. 

In 2019 he co-penned a letter to The Guardian acknowledging that The UN Independent Commission of Inquiry on the 2018 Gaza protests should be supported in full. 

In 2022, he wrote an op-ed in an Irish newspaper agreeing with the then recent Amnesty International report characterizing Israel as an apartheid regime.

His grandmother, Sarah Jannah, owned a home in Sheikh Jarrah before 1948. Ben-Yair has been very strongly against the evictions of Palestinians from the former family home and wishes to regain ownership and allow the Palestinians to live in the building for a nominal rent.

References

Attorneys General of Israel
1942 births
Living people
21st-century Israeli judges